Erik Skjoldbjærg (born December 14, 1964) is a Norwegian director and writer best known for co-writing and directing the film Insomnia and the long awaited Narvik. His film Pioneer was selected to be screened in the Special Presentation section at the 2013 Toronto International Film Festival.

Filmography

As director
 Vinterveien (Near Winter, short film, 1993, also wrote)
 Close to Home (short film, 1994, also wrote)
 Spor (1996, also wrote)
 Insomnia (1997, also wrote)
 Prozac Nation (2001)
 Skolen (TV series, unknown episodes, 2004)
 En folkefiende (An Enemy of the People, 2005, also wrote)
 Størst av alt (TV series, 3 episodes, 2006)
 Nokas (2010)
 Pionér (Pioneer, 2013, also wrote)
 Pyromaniac (2016)
 Forsvinningen - Lørenskog 31. oktober 2018 (The Lørenskog Disappearance, miniseries, 3 episodes, 2022)
 Narvik (2022)

As writer
 Insomnia (1997 screenplay, 2002)
 Occupied (2015–20)

References

External links

Living people
1964 births
Norwegian film directors
People from Tromsø